The 1995 Big East Conference baseball tournament was held at Muzzy Field in Bristol, Connecticut. This was the eleventh annual Big East Conference baseball tournament. The  won their first tournament championship and claimed the Big East Conference's automatic bid to the 1995 NCAA Division I baseball tournament.

Format and seeding 
The Big East baseball tournament was a 4 team double elimination tournament in 1995. The top four regular season finishers were seeded one through four based on conference winning percentage only. Pittsburgh claimed the fourth seed by winning the season series over St. John's.

Bracket

Jack Kaiser Award 
Jon DeBernardis was the winner of the 1995 Jack Kaiser Award. DeBernardis was a third baseman for Pittsburgh.

References 

Tournament
Big East Conference Baseball Tournament
Big East Conference baseball tournament
Big East Conference baseball tournament
College baseball tournaments in Connecticut
Bristol, Connecticut
Sports competitions in Hartford County, Connecticut